Limpinwood is a town located in north-eastern New South Wales, Australia, in the Tweed Shire.

The town was named for "Hoppin Jack Wood", an early settler.

Limpinwood Nature Reserve is located to the north-west of Limpinwood.

Demographics

The median age of the Limpinwood population was 49 years, 12 years above the national median of 37.

81.6% of people living in Limpinwood were born in Australia. The other top responses for country of birth were England 6.7%, Hungary 2.2%, 9.5% other countries.

92.4% of people spoke only English at home; the next most common language was French, at 1.3%, with 6.3% speaking other languages.

References 

Suburbs of Tweed Heads, New South Wales